The Kawasaki P-2J (originally P2V-Kai) is a maritime patrol and ASW aircraft developed for the Japan Maritime Self-Defense Force. A turboprop-powered version of the radial-engined P-2 Neptune, the P-2J was developed as an alternative to buying the larger and more expensive P-3 Orion, which would eventually replace the P-2J in the 1980s.

Design and development

The Kawasaki-built P-2J (originally P2V-Kai, where "Kai" (改) means modification) was the last version of the Neptune to be produced. Work on the P-2J was begun in 1961. The first P-2J, converted from a P2V-7 (P-2H) performed its initial flight on 21 July 1966, and the last of a further 82 production P-2Js was delivered in March 1979.

The Wright radial engines of the Lockheed P-2s were replaced with 2,125 kW (2,850 HP) Ishikawajima-Harima T64-IHI-10 turboprop engines, using three-bladed propellers instead of the four-bladed units of late-model P-2s.

The P-2J had accommodations for up to 12 crewmen. The forward fuselage was extended , with the tail surfaces being enlarged and their shape modified. AN/APS-80 search radar was fitted in a smaller radome. Updated avionics systems were installed, and these systems were much more compact than those used in other versions of the Neptune. The lighter avionics load permitted greater fuel capacity. The P-2J's main gear was fitted with two wheels each, rather than the one large wheel of the earlier models.

Operational history

The P-2J was phased out in the 1980s in favor of the P-3C Orion, which eventually replaced the Neptune in the ocean-patrol air fleets of the West. The last maritime reconnaissance squadron re-equipped with the Orion in 1993, but the P-2J remained in service for electronic reconnaissance and target support purposes.

Variants

P-2J  Originally called the P2V-Kai 
T64 turboprop engines, IHI J3 engine pods, improved ASW/ECM gear, APS-80 search radar standard, increased fuel capacity, various other improvements; 1 converted from a P-2H, and 82 new-builds.
EP-2J P-2J converted for electronic intelligence gathering. Two converted.
UP-2J P-2J converted for drone support, target towing and test purposes. Four converted.

Operators

 Japan Maritime Self-Defense Force

Specifications (P-2J)

See also

References

 
 

 Sullivan, Jim, P2V Neptune in action. Squadron/Signal Publications: Carrollton, TX, 1985.

External links

 AirVectors P2V Neptune page
 http://p2vneptune.com
 http://www.maam.org/neptune/p2_1.html

Kawasaki aircraft
1960s Japanese patrol aircraft
Aircraft with auxiliary jet engines
P-002J
Mid-wing aircraft
Aircraft first flown in 1966
Twin-turboprop tractor aircraft